The City Harmonic was a Canadian Christian rock band based in Hamilton, Ontario. Elias Dummer (vocals, keyboards, guitar), Eric Fusilier (bass), Aaron Powell (guitar), and Josh Vanderlaan (drums) collectively made up The City Harmonic. Their music has been described as "nostalgic Brit-pop meets campfire sing-along mix that features raucous gang vocals along with agile, soaring anthems crafted to include the listener". Musically, their sound is often compared to artists like Coldplay, Keane, Aqualung, the Fray, or Arcade Fire. In 2011 they won three Covenant Awards from GMA Canada for New Artist of the Year, Recorded Song of the Year and Modern Worship Song of the Year. In 2013 they won Covenant Awards for Group of the Year and Praise and Worship Song of the Year. They also won a Juno Award for the 2013 Christian/Contemporary Gospel Album of the Year. After announcing that they would retire, the band recorded their final show, which was released as a live album, Benediction (Live), on June 23, 2017.

History
The City Harmonic formed in 2009 after its members served together as the house worship band for an inter-denominational "worship and mission" event for students in Hamilton.
The band released their debut EP, Introducing the City Harmonic, in November 2010 in Canada and the United States. Their début single, "Manifesto" appeared in the charts in several categories. "Manifesto" remained on Billboards Christian charts for 15 weeks and was featured as the walk-up song for then-Oakland Athletics outfielder Seth Smith. The EP was also released in January 2011 in Britain.

The band released their first full-length album titled I Have a Dream (It Feels Like Home) on October 18, 2011. On November 5, 2011 it peaked at No. 34 on Billboards Christian Albums chart, and at No. 6 on the Heatseekers Albums chart. A song from this album, "Holy (Wedding Day)", was released on September 21, 2012. As of January 22, 2012 it had reached No. 39 on the Billboard Christian Songs chart and had the fifth biggest jump.

The group was nominated for a 2012 GMA Dove Award for "New Artist of the Year".

On April 20, 2013, the band won a Juno award for Christian/Contemporary Gospel Album of the Year.

The band released their second full-length album titled Heart on September 3, 2013. In the week of release in Canada it reached No. 1 on the Inspirational Albums Charts. For the Billboard charting week of September 21, 2013, Heart No. 20 on the Top Heatseekers chart and No. 24 Top Christian Albums chart. Critically speaking, Heart had been the most critically well-received of the band's releases to date. The album artwork features an adaptation of Leonardo da Vinci's Vitruvian Man, with Jesus on the cross in the center.

After announcing its release during an appearance and performance on NBC's Beyond A.D., the band released their third full-length album titled We Are on September 4, 2015. Well received by critics. The album reached No. 1 on the Inspirational Albums Charts in Canada, and appeared on Billboard on both the Heatseekers and Christian and Gospel Albums charts. The album is focused on the band's origins and addresses the themes of unity in the Church and the movement of churches that brought them together. In addition to their appearance on NBC, the band have performed songs from this album on the Relevant Podcast as well as on the 10,000th episode of 100 Huntley Street on YES TV.

Released concurrently with the album of the same name, the documentary, We Are the City Harmonic: The Movie, was filmed and directed by Jesse Hunt of Cycle films, and tells the story of the movement of Christian unity in Hamilton, Ontario that brought the band together. It was released free to YouTube as well as the band's own domains.

The City Harmonic disbanded in 2017. They recorded their final show in their hometown of Hamilton, Ontario, and released the recording as an album, Benediction (Live). The album was released to critical acclaim, with Jesus Freak Hideout describing it as "quite possibly the best worship release this year."

Lineup

Members
 Elias Elton Dummer – vocals, keyboards, guitar (2009–2017)
 Eric Morgan Fusilier – bass, vocals (2009–2016)
 Aaron Christian Powell – guitar, vocals (2009–2017)
 Josh Alexander Vanderlaan – drums (2009–2017)

Touring musicians
 Steve Lensink – bass, guitar, vocals (2012–2014, 2016–2017)
 Jason Lackey – bass (2016)
 Justin Brix – guitar, keys, vocals (2017)
 Brooke Nicholls – vocals (2017)

Discography

Albums 

 Introducing the City Harmonic EP (2010)
 I Have a Dream (It Feels Like Home) (2011) Released on October 18, 2011
 Heart (2013) September 3, 2013
 We Are (2015) September 4, 2015
 Benediction (Live) (2017) June 23, 2017

Singles

Awards
GMA Covenant Awards

JUNO Awards

Dove Awards

References

External links

Musical groups established in 2006
Musical groups from Hamilton, Ontario
Canadian Christian rock groups
2006 establishments in Ontario
Juno Award for Contemporary Christian/Gospel Album of the Year winners